Kim Jin-sung (born 16 June 1997) is a South Korean professional footballer who plays as a centre-back for K3 League club Ulsan Citizen.

Career

Madura United
On 27 August 2021, Kim moved to Indonesia. He signed contract with Indonesian Liga 1 club Madura United. Kim made his debut on 12 September 2021 at Gelora Bung Karno Madya Stadium, as a starter, he provided an assist in a 1-1 league draw against PSM Makassar.

Barito Putera
In January 2022, Kim signed a contract with Liga 1 club Barito Putera. Kim made his league debut in a 3–0 lost against Bali United as a starter on 9 January 2022 at the Ngurah Rai Stadium, Denpasar.

References

External links
Kim Jin-sung at Soccerway

1997 births
Living people
Association football midfielders
South Korean footballers
South Korean expatriate footballers
Jeonnam Dragons players
K League 2 players
Liga 1 (Indonesia) players
Madura United F.C. players
PS Barito Putera players
South Korean expatriate sportspeople in Indonesia
Expatriate footballers in Indonesia